Rosa Molina Arias (born 27 September 1946) is a Chilean athlete. She competed in the women's shot put at the 1968 Summer Olympics and the 1972 Summer Olympics.

References

1946 births
Living people
Athletes (track and field) at the 1968 Summer Olympics
Athletes (track and field) at the 1972 Summer Olympics
Chilean female shot putters
Olympic athletes of Chile
Athletes (track and field) at the 1967 Pan American Games
Athletes (track and field) at the 1971 Pan American Games
Pan American Games bronze medalists for Chile
Pan American Games medalists in athletics (track and field)
Sportspeople from Concepción, Chile
Medalists at the 1971 Pan American Games
20th-century Chilean women